Closing Bell can refer to two CNBC programs: the original Closing Bell on CNBC (which debuted on February 4, 2002) and European Closing Bell on CNBC Europe (which was cancelled on December 18, 2015).

The show is named after the bell that is rung to signify the end of a trading session on the New York Stock Exchange which occurs at 4:00 pm EST. Many exchanges used to signify end of trading with a gong or bell when they were operated on an open outcry basis.  The New York Stock Exchange still uses this system and often invites special guests to ring the bell.

The CNBC shows use this name as they cover the period up to the end of trading and review the trading of the day after the market has closed.

About the show

History
Closing Bell airs on CNBC between 3pm and 4pm, Eastern Time.  The program is anchored by Sara Eisen at the NYSE.

Maria Bartiromo was the original anchor of the show ran from 3-5pm ET until she departed from the network on November 22, 2013 to join the Fox Business Network. During the 4-5pm block, Maria said with the phrase, "it is 4 O'Clock on Wall Street - do you know where your money is?".  Bartiromo's role was replaced with Kelly Evans following the former's aforementioned departure.  Like her predecessor, Evans anchored the 4-5pm ET block.  Tyler Mathisen was the former co-anchor from 3-4pm ET (originally from 4-5pm ET), until he was promoted in 2005.  That same year, Dylan Ratigan took over the 3-4pm ET co-anchoring duties until his departure from the network in March 2009. Starting January 2011, Bill Griffeth became co-anchor after co-anchoring Power Lunch since 1996-2009 and taking a 1-year leave of absence.  On March 12, 2018, Griffeth moved to PBS' Nightly Business Report to reunite with his former Power Lunch co-anchor, Sue Herera, while Frost (formerly co-anchor of Worldwide Exchange) replaced Griffeth as Kelly Evans' co-anchor of Closing Bell.

In 2012, Closing Bell moved to a new trading-floor studio set inside Post 9 at the NYSE, which is shared with two other CNBC US shows, Squawk on the Street and TechCheck (formerly Squawk Alley).On October 13, 2014, Closing Bell, along with CNBC's other trading-day programs, were launched in full 1080i high-definition as part of a network-wide switch to a full 16:9 letterbox presentation.

On November 30, 2018, Sara Eisen (also at the time, co-anchor of Squawk on the Street), who filled in for Kelly Evans while the latter was on away maternity leave, took over Evans' role permanently, with Wilfred Frost also co-anchoring both hours of the show with Eisen.  By coincidence, both Frost and Eisen had previously co-anchored Worldwide Exchange for 2 years.  Following Frost's departure on February 16, 2022, Michael Santoli became co-anchor and held that post until March 14, when Eisen became the sole anchor of Closing Bell, which itself had its runtime halved from two hours to one hour.  Closing Bell: Overtime, anchored by Scott Wapner, replaced the second hour of Closing Bell, also on March 14.

On February 21, 2023, Wapner moved to Closing Bell, replacing Sara Eisen, the latter of whom returned to Squawk on the Street to replace Morgan Brennan, who in turn, moved to Closing Bell: Overtime.  Jon Fortt, previously a co-anchor of the now-cancelled TechCheck, joined Brennan as co-anchor of Closing Bell: Overtime.

Content
The first hour of the program covers the last hour of trading in the US stock markets, covering the closing bells of the NYSE and NASDAQ Stock Market at 4pm ET.  Bob Pisani provides live reports from the floor of the New York Stock Exchange.  Scott Wapner provided live reports from the NASDAQ until becoming the host of CNBC Halftime Report (his role has since been filled by Bertha Coombs). 

At around 3:45p EST, the segment “Closing Bell: Market Zone” begins. This segment includes the latest business news and what’s moving the markets that day, plus expert analysis until the close at 4P EST. This segment is divided into sections which are shown in a lower-third which shows upcoming topics along with a text box. When this segment begins, a sidebar appears on the right, showing the major indexes, and stocks moving the market. Along with that, on the top is a countdown clock, which replaces the one which appears on the bottom where the bug normally is and starts at 3P EST, and stops when the Market Zone starts.

After 4pm ET, the show's name changes to Closing Bell: Overtime and this hour features analysis of the day's winners and losers, company results that are issued after the close of trade, and other business news.

Hosts

Current anchors
 Morgan Brennan (2023–present), Closing Bell: Overtime
 Jon Fortt (2023–present), Closing Bell: Overtime
 Scott Wapner (2023–present)

Former anchors
 Maria Bartiromo (2002–2013), now anchor of Mornings with Maria on Fox Business
 Sara Eisen (2018–2023), now co-anchor of Squawk on the Street
 Kelly Evans (2013–2018), now anchor of The Exchange and co-anchor of Power Lunch
 Wilfred Frost (2018–2022), now at Sky News
 Bill Griffeth (2011–2018), now CNBC anchor at-large; was previously co-anchor of Nightly Business Report until its end in late December 2019
 Tyler Mathisen (2002–2005), now co-anchor of Power Lunch
 Dylan Ratigan (2006–2009), along with Closing Bell, formerly hosted Fast Money; he then hosted The Dylan Ratigan Show on MSNBC from 2009–2012; since then, he is no longer active in the television industry
 Michael Santoli (February–March 2022)

Worldwide Closing Bell
Around CNBC's global branches, there are many counterparts of Closing Bell in the world:

As the major Asian markets all close at different times, there is no "Asian Closing Bell". The equivalent programme is Worldwide Exchange, which replaced Asia Market Wrap on 2005-12-19.

See also
Asia Market Wrap (discontinued after 2005-12-16)
Worldwide Exchange
European Closing Bell (discontinued after 2015-12-18)
Europe Tonight (discontinued after 2010-03-01)
Europe This Week
Countdown to the Closing Bell (a Fox Business Network program aired from 3-4 ET the same timeslot)
 List of programs broadcast by CNBC

References

External links
Closing Bell official website on CNBC.com
Closing Bell official blog on CNBC.com: Closing Time (since 2006-12-04)

2002 American television series debuts
2000s American television talk shows
2010s American television talk shows
2020s American television talk shows
2000s American television news shows
2010s American television news shows
2020s American television news shows
CNBC original programming
CNBC Europe original programming
CNBC Asia original programming
Business-related television series